The 2012 Minnesota Golden Gophers football team represented the University of Minnesota in the 2012 NCAA Division I FBS football season. They were led by second-year head coach Jerry Kill and played their home games at TCF Bank Stadium. They were a member of the Legends Division of the Big Ten Conference. They finished the season 6–7, 2–6 in Big Ten play to finish in a tie for fifth place in the Legends Division. They were invited to the Meineke Car Care Bowl of Texas where they were defeated by Texas Tech.

Schedule

Source: Schedule

Roster
The preliminary roster is based on the previous season's roster and eligibility, along with incoming recruits. All numbers are from www.gophersports.com.

Game summaries

Syracuse

Source: ESPN
    
    
    
    
    

Minnesota's best start since 2008

References

Minnesota
Minnesota Golden Gophers football seasons
Minnesota Golden Gophers football